Paul Claxton (born February 9, 1968) is an American professional golfer.

Biography
Claxton was born and raised in Vidalia, Georgia. He attended the University of Georgia and was a member of the golf team. He majored in Business and graduated in 1992.

Claxton turn professional in 1993. He was a member of the PGA Tour in 1997, 2002, 2005 and 2008. He was a member of the Nationwide Tour in 1995-96, 1998–2001, 2003–04, 2006–07 and 2009-10. When he won the 2007 Melwood Prince George's County Open, he surpassed $1,000,000 in earnings on the Nationwide Tour becoming the first player to do so.

Claxton has participated in two majors, including the 2005 U.S. Open. He finished tied for 23rd.

After Claxton's touring career ended, he became a club professional in Georgia. He qualified for the 2017 PGA Championship through the PGA Professional Championship.

Claxton lives in Vidalia, Georgia.

Amateur wins
1991 Sunnehanna Amateur

Professional wins (5)

Nationwide Tour wins (2)

Nationwide Tour playoff record (0–2)

Other wins (3)
2017 Georgia Open
2018 Georgia PGA Championship
2019 Georgia PGA Championship

Results in major championships

CUT = missed the half-way cut
"T" = tied
Note: Claxton never played in the Masters Tournament or The Open Championship.

U.S. national team appearances
PGA Cup: 2017

See also
1996 PGA Tour Qualifying School graduates
2001 PGA Tour Qualifying School graduates
2004 PGA Tour Qualifying School graduates
2007 Nationwide Tour graduates

References

External links
 

American male golfers
Georgia Bulldogs men's golfers
PGA Tour golfers
Korn Ferry Tour graduates
Golfers from Georgia (U.S. state)
People from Vidalia, Georgia
1968 births
Living people